Edwin Pearce Christy (November 28, 1815 – May 21, 1862) was an American composer, singer, actor and stage producer. He is more commonly known as E. P. Christy, and was the founder of the blackface minstrel group Christy's Minstrels.

Biography
He was born on November 28, 1815, in Philadelphia, Pennsylvania, to Robert F. Christy and Ruth Wheaton.

Christy began his career as a minstrel in Buffalo, New York. By 1836 he was a member of the company managed by Edwin Dean at the Eagle Street Theater in Buffalo. He toured upstate New York from 1843 to 1845. The group took the name of its founder and became known as the Christy's Minstrels. In April 1846 Christy and his band of six performers began performing in New York City at Polmer's Opera House. The group performed at Mechanics Hall from February 15, 1847, to July 15, 1854. After performing at a benefit performance for Stephen Foster in Cincinnati, Ohio, on August 25, 1847, the group specialized in performances of Foster's works. Foster sold his song, Old Folks at Home, to Christy for his exclusive use.

Christy retired as a performer in 1855.

He operated a chain of theaters called Christy's Opera Houses in several cities. The name of the original group, Christy's Minstrels, was licensed for use by a new organization and became synonymous with the performance tradition of blackface minstrelsy.

Fearful of financial reverses due to the upheaval of the American Civil War, Christy committed suicide by throwing himself from a window in his home at 78 East Eighteenth Street, one block east of Broadway, in Manhattan, New York City, on May 20, 1862. He died on May 21, 1862, of his injuries.  He was buried in Green-Wood Cemetery in Brooklyn, New York. His oral last will and testament that was made while hospitalized was declared void by the surrogate court when it ruled that there were no witnesses, other than the person providing the testimony. In 1881 his widow died and her will was contested.

Legacy
Christy is played by Al Jolson in the Foster bio-pic Swanee River in 1939.  He also wrote the lyrics to "The Yellow Rose of Texas".

References

Further reading
 . p. 171.
 Edwin Pearce Christy at the Internet Archive

1815 births
1862 deaths
Male actors from Philadelphia
Musicians from Philadelphia
Blackface minstrel performers
Blackface minstrel songwriters
Suicides by jumping in New York City
Burials at Green-Wood Cemetery
19th-century American male actors
19th-century American singers
Songwriters from Pennsylvania
1860s suicides